The Story of Papworth (also known as The Story of Papworth, the Village of Hope) is a 1935 British short drama film directed by Anthony Asquith and starring Madeleine Carroll, Gordon Harker and C. Aubrey Smith. The screenplay concerns a consumptive (a tuberculosis sufferer) who is saved by the village of Papworth, which raises funds for his treatment.

The film shared its royal premiere before Queen Mary on 17 December 1935 at the Leicester Square Theatre with René Clair's The Ghost Goes West. The whole of the ticket proceeds was devoted to funding a nurses' home at Papworth Village Settlement.

References

External links
 

1935 films
British drama short films
1935 drama films
Films directed by Anthony Asquith
British black-and-white films
1930s English-language films
1930s British films